Edwin Leroy Combs (born January 1, 1961 in Oklahoma City, Oklahoma) is a retired professional basketball small forward who spent one season in the National Basketball Association (NBA) as a member of the Indiana Pacers during the 1983–84 season. He was drafted during the second round of the 1983 NBA Draft by the Pacers.

References

External links

1961 births
Living people
American men's basketball players
Basketball players from Oklahoma
Cincinnati Slammers players
Detroit Spirits players
Indiana Pacers draft picks
Indiana Pacers players
Oklahoma State Cowboys basketball players
Quad City Thunder players
Sportspeople from Oklahoma City
Small forwards